Emma Justine Farnsworth (October 16, 1860–January 23, 1952) was an American photographer from Albany, New York known for her pictorialist photogravures and scenes illustrating children's literature.

Biography 
Born in New York, Farnsworth was the daughter of Civil War general, Jonathan Gosman Farnsworth, and Sara Visscher Gourlay.

Career 
Farnsworth had training in the arts. After receiving her first camera as a gift in 1890, she began photographing seriously within a few months.  She joined the Society of Amateur Photographers in New York City since the local amateur groups in Albany did not allow women as members. As a member of The Camera Club of New York, Farnsworth's photographs were featured in In Arcadia, 1892, a book of figure studies accompanied by Classical verse, published by another member, George M. Allen. Her photographs were exhibited at the World's Columbian Exposition (1893). Before the end of the decade, she had been awarded almost 30 medals at various exhibitions in the world, and her work appeared frequently in the noted periodical Camera Notes, the journal of the Camera Club of New York, edited primarily by Alfred Stieglitz. Her photographs were displayed in 1893 at the Sixth Joint Annual Exhibition (which presented work by 187 photographers from New York, Boston, and Philadelphia) at the Pennsylvania Academy of Fine Arts. In a review, Stieglitz characterized Farnsworth's photos as "unaffected and full of individuality." Her work was also included in the Paris Exposition (1900). Her specialties were genre and figure studies, especially children and animals. Farnsworth exhibited internationally, and was included in the show, American Women Photographers, organized by Frances Benjamin Johnston, and presented at the Paris Exposition in 1900.

She died in Albany, New York, on January 23, 1952.

References

External links 
 
 

1860 births
1952 deaths
Artists from Albany, New York
19th-century American photographers
Photographers from New York (state)
19th-century American women
19th-century American women photographers